Streats was an English broadsheet daily newspaper in Singapore, launched on 4 September 2000. It ceased publishing on 1 January 2005 and merged into TODAY.

History
Streats was launched on 4 September 2000 by Singapore Press Holdings. It was an English broadsheet daily newspaper in Singapore, with the other being Today.

On 8 March 2004, Streats launched an afternoon edition. It provided updates on financial and sports news and is given out in selected locations of the business district.

On 31 December 2004, Streats was merged into the daily news as a result of SPH and MediaCorp merging free-to-air terrestrial television and newspaper operations.

It ceased publishing on 1 January 2005 and was renamed to become TODAY, a subsidiary of MediaCorp Press & member of MediaCorp a print media arm.

References

External links
 Streats Online (broken link, Wayback Machine archives)
 GetForMe: "Hello 2005; Goodbye Streats" - has a picture of the inaugural issue

2000 establishments in Singapore
2005 disestablishments in Singapore
Newspapers established in 2000
Publications disestablished in 2005
Defunct newspapers published in Singapore
Singapore Press Holdings
English-language newspapers published in Asia